Schwa deletion, or schwa syncope, is a phenomenon that sometimes occurs in Assamese, Hindi, Urdu, Bengali, Kashmiri, Punjabi, Gujarati, and several other Indian languages with schwas that are implicit in their written scripts. Languages like Marathi and Maithili with increased influence from other languages through coming into contact with them—also show a similar phenomenon. Some schwas are obligatorily deleted in pronunciation even if the script suggests otherwise.

Schwa deletion is important for intelligibility and unaccented speech. It also presents a challenge to non-native speakers and speech synthesis software because the scripts, including Devanagari, do not tell when schwas should be deleted.

For example, the Sanskrit word "Rāma" (राम) is pronounced "Rām" (राम्) in Hindi. The schwa (ə) sound at the end of the word is deleted in Hindi. However, in both cases, the word is written राम.

The schwa is not deleted in ancient languages such as Sanskrit or Pali, or medieval forms such as Early Assamese. The schwa is also retained in all the modern registers of the languages Tamil, Telugu, Kannada, and Malayalam as well as Odia.

Hindi
Although the Devanagari script is used as a standard to write Modern Hindi, the schwa ('ə') implicit in each consonant of the script is "obligatorily deleted" at the end of words and in certain other contexts, unlike in Sanskrit. That phenomenon has been termed the "schwa syncope rule" or the "schwa deletion rule" of Hindi. One formalisation of this rule has been summarised as ə → ∅ /VC_CV. In other words, when a schwa-succeeded consonant (itself preceded by another vowel) is followed by a vowel-succeeded consonant, the schwa inherent in the first consonant is deleted. However, this rule sometimes deletes a schwa that should remain and sometimes fails to delete a schwa when it should be deleted. The rule is reported to result in correct predictions on schwa deletion 89% of the time.

Schwa deletion is computationally important because it is essential to building text-to-speech software for Hindi.

As a result of schwa syncope, the Hindi pronunciation of many words differs from that expected from a literal Sanskrit-style reading of Devanagari. For instance, राम is pronounced Rām (not Rāma, as in Sanskrit), रचना is pronounced Rachnā (not Rachanā), वेद is pronounced Ved (not Veda) and नमकीन is pronounced Namkīn (not Namakīna). The name of the script itself is pronounced Devnāgrī, not Devanāgarī.

Correct schwa deletion is also critical because the same letter sequence is pronounced two different ways in Hindi depending on the context. Failure to delete the appropriate schwas can then change the meaning. For instance, the letter sequence 'रक' is pronounced differently in हरकत (har.kat, meaning movement or activity) and सरकना (sarak.na, meaning to slide). Similarly, the sequence धड़कने in दिल धड़कने लगा (the heart started beating) and in दिल की धड़कनें (beats of the heart) is identical prior to the nasalisation in the second usage. However, it is pronounced dhaṛak.ne in the first and dhaṛ.kanẽ in the second.

While native speakers pronounce the sequences differently in different contexts, non-native speakers and voice-synthesis software can make them "sound very unnatural", making it "extremely difficult for the listener" to grasp the intended meaning.

Schwa deletion in other Indian languages
Different Indian languages can differ in how they apply schwa deletion. For instance, medial schwas from Sanskrit-origin words are often retained in Bengali even if they are deleted in Hindi. An example of this is रचना/রচনা which is pronounced racanā (/rɐtɕɐnaː/) in Sanskrit, rachnā (/rətʃnɑː/) in Hindi and rôchona (/rɔtʃona/) in Bengali. While the medial schwa is deleted in Hindi (because of the ə → ∅ / VC_CV rule), it is retained in Bengali.

On the other hand, the final schwa in वेद /বেদ is deleted in both Hindi and Bengali (Sanskrit: /veːd̪ə/, Hindi: /veːd̪/, Bengali: /bed̪/).

Assamese
The Assamese equivalent for Schwa is Open back rounded vowel or [ɒ]. Assamese deleted this vowel at the end of consonant ending words, with a few exceptions like in numerals. In clusters, it's deleted in words like কান্ধ (/kandʱ-/, shoulder), বান্ধ (/bandʱ-/, bond) while optional in the word গোন্ধ (/ɡʊnˈdʱ(ɒ)/, smell). Modern Standard Assamese developed the schwa in words like কাছ (/kaˈsɒ/, turtle), পাৰ (/paˈɹɒ/, pigeon), তই কৰ (/tɔɪ kɒɹɒ/, you do) which appear with different vowels in some other dialects, like কাছু /ˈkasu/, পাৰা /ˈpaɾa/, কৰাহ /ˈkɒɾaʱ/ in some Kamrupi dialects. Eastern (and its sub-dialect, Standard) and Central Assamese retained the schwa in medial positions, like নিজৰা (/niˈzɒɹa/, stream), বিচনি (/biˈsɔni/, handfan), বতৰা (/bɒˈtɒɹa/, news), পাহৰে (/paˈɦɒɹe/, forgets), নকৰে (/nɒˈkɒɹe/, doesn't do), which were deleted in some of the Kamrupi dialect, while some others kept them as /a/. Conjuncts in Sanskrit loanwords always have the schwa, and in consonants ending words (that are followed by schwa), the schwa is optionally present in words ending with suffixes, for example, শিক্ষিত from Sanskrit शिक्षित (śikṣita, "educated") is pronounced both as /x̩ikˈkʰitɒ/ and /xˌikˈkʰit/.

Bengali
The Bengali equivalent for Schwa is Open-mid back rounded vowel or [ɔ].
Bengali deletes this vowel at the end when not ending in a consonant cluster but sometimes retains this vowel at the medial position. The consonant clusters at the end of a word usually follows a Close-mid back rounded vowel or [o]. For example, the Sanskrit word पथ (/pɐt̪ʰɐ/, way) corresponds to the Bengali word পথ /pɔt̪ʰ/. But the Skt. word अन्त (/ɐnt̪ɐ/, end) retains the end vowel and becomes অন্ত /ɔnt̪o/ in Bengali, as it ends with a consonant cluster.

However, tatsama borrowings from Sanskrit generally retain the 'ɔˈ except in word-final positions and except in very informal speech.

That vowel in medial position are not always retained. For instance, 'কলকাতা' is pronounced as /kolkat̪a/, and not /kolɔkat̪a/. (although different pronunciations based on dialect exist, none pronounce it this way).

Gujarati
Gujarati has a strong schwa deletion phenomenon, affecting both medial and final schwas. From an evolutionary perspective, the final schwas appear to have been lost prior to the medial ones.

Kashmiri
In the Dardic subbranch of Indoian, Kashmiri similarly demonstrates schwa deletion. For instance, drākṣa (द्राक्ष) is the Sanskrit word for grape, but the final schwa is dropped in the Kashmiri version, which is dach (दछ् or دَچھ).

Maithili
Maithili's schwa deletion differs from other neighbouring languages. It actually doesn't delete schwa, but shortens it., ə → ə̆ / VC_CV applies to the language. Maithili with increased influence of other languages through coming into contact with them has been showing the phenomenon of schwa deletion sometimes with words that traditionally pronounce schwas. For instance, हमरो is həməro (even ours) with schwas but is pronounced həmᵊro. That is akin to the neighbouring Bhojpuri in which हमरा (meaning mine) is pronounced həmrā rather than həmərā from the deletion of a medial schwa.

Marathi

Marathi exhibits extensive schwa deletion. The schwa at the end of a word is almost always deleted, except in the case of a few tatsama words from Sanskrit as well as when the word ends in a conjunct. Schwas essentially get deleted when there is an opportunity for a consonant with a schwa to turn into a coda consonant for the previous syllable, though the actual rules are more complicated and have exceptions.

However, in places where the schwa occurs in the middle of words, Marathi does exhibit a propensity to pronounce it far more regularly than Hindi. Words like प्रेरणा, मानसी, केतकी retain the schwa sound in the र, न, and त respectively, often leading to their transliteration by native Marathi speakers in the Roman script as Prerana, Manasi and Ketaki rather than Prerna, Mansi or Ketki.

Sometimes, to avoid schwa deletion, an anusvara is placed at the end of the word. For example, the word खर ("roughness") is often read without the schwa. When the schwa needs to be made explicit, it is written as खरं ("true"). This often happens in the case of pluralization, e.g. फूल ("flower") can be written as having the plural फुलं ("flowers"). This arises from the original plural marker -एं (as in फुलें , "flowers") having degraded to a schwa in modern speech, and the anusvara serves a purpose as a non-deleted vowel even though it is not realized as a nasal.

Nepali

Nepali orthography is comparatively more phonetic than Hindi when it comes to schwa retention. Schwas are often retained within the words unless deletion is signaled by the use of a halanta(्). सुलोचना (a name) is pronounced  by Hindi speakers while  by Nepali speakers.  Some exceptions exist, such as सरकार (government), pronounced , not .

The following rules can be followed to figure out whether or not Nepali words retain the final schwa in a word.

 Schwa is retained if the final syllable is a conjunct consonant.
 Although postpositions are written joined to the preceding word in Nepali (unlike Hindi), schwa cancellation treats the words as if they were written separately.  For example, उसको (his, of him) is not pronounced as *; it is pronounced as if it were written उस को: . Similarly, रामले (Ram-ergative marker, by Ram) is pronounced  rather than *.
 For any verb form the final schwa is always retained unless the schwa-cancelling halanta is present.  ('it happens'),  ('in happening so; therefore'),  ('he apparently went'), but  ('they are'),  ('she went').  Meanings may change with the wrong orthography:  ('she didn't go') vs  ('she went').
 Adverbs, onomatopoeia and postpositions usually maintain the schwa and if they don't, halanta is acquired:  ( 'now'),  ('towards'),  ('today')  ( 'drizzle') vs  ('more').
 A few exceptional nouns retain the schwa such as:  ('suffering'),  ('pleasure').

Note that schwas are often retained in music and poetry to facilitate singing and recitation.

Odia
 
Odia in its standardised form retains the schwa in its pronunciation as an open-mid back rounded vowel. Both medial and final schwas are retained: in the medial case ଝରଣା jharaṇā is pronounced /dʒʱɔɾɔɳā/ (spring) and in the final case ଟଗର ṭagara is pronounced /ʈɔgɔɾɔ/ (spring).

Sanskrit loanwords or ‘tatsama’ words, being more formal, always have the schwa pronounced.

However, deletion is more common in a number of non-standard dialects, as well as increasingly in the speech of urban areas as a result of exposure to English and Hindi. For Example: The name of the city ‘Bhubaneshwar’ can be pronounced either informally as /bʰubɔneswɔɾ/, or more formally /bʰubɔneswɔɾɔ/.

Punjabi
Punjabi has broad schwa deletion rules: several base word forms (ਕਾਗ਼ਜ਼, کاغز, kāghəz/paper) drop schwas in the plural form (ਕਾਗ਼ਜ਼ਾਂ, کاغزاں, kāghzāṅ/papers) as well as with ablative (ਕਾਗ਼ਜ਼ੋਂ, کاغزوں, kāghzōṅ/from the paper) and locative (ਕਾਗ਼ਜ਼ੇ, کاغزے, kāghzé/on the paper) suffixes.

Common transcription and diction issues
Since Devanagari does not provide indications of where schwas should be deleted, it is common for non-native learners/speakers of Hindi, who are otherwise familiar with Devanagari and Sanskrit, to make incorrect pronunciations of words in Hindustani and other modern North Indian languages. Similarly, systems that automate transliteration from Devanagari to Latin script by hardcoding implicit schwas in every consonant often indicate the written form rather than the pronunciation. That becomes evident when English words are transliterated into Devanagari by Hindi-speakers and then transliterated back into English by manual or automated processes that do not account for Hindi's schwa deletion rules. For instance, the word English may be written by Hindi speakers as इंगलिश (rather than इंग्लिश्) which may be transliterated back to Ingalisha by automated systems, but schwa deletion would result in इंगलिश being correctly pronounced as Inglish by native Hindi-speakers.

Some examples are shown below:

{| class="wikitable"
|-
!Word in Devanagari and meaning
!Pronunciation in Hindi (with schwa syncope)
!Pronunciation without schwa syncope
!Comments
|-
|लपट (flame)
|ləpəṭ
|ləpəṭə
|The final schwa is deleted 
|-
|लपटें (flames)
|ləpṭeṅ
|ləpəṭeṅ
|The medial schwa, ləpəṭ, which was retained in लपट, is deleted in लपटें 
|-
|समझ (understanding)
|səməjh
|səməjhə
|The final schwa is deleted 
|-
|समझा (understood, verb masc.)
|səmjhā
|səməjhā
|The medial vowel also is deleted here, which it wasn't in समझ
|-
|भारत (India)
|bhārət
|bhārətə
|Final schwa is deleted
|-
|भारतीय (Indian)
|bhārtīy
|bhārətīyə
|Both the medial and final schwa are deleted, although the final schwa is sometimes faintly pronounced due to the 'y' glide; when pronounced without this, the word sounds close to 'bhārtī'''
|-
|देवनागरी (Devanagari, the script)
|devnāgrī|devənāgərī|Two medial schwas (after व and after ग) are deleted|-
|इंगलिश (English, the language)
|inglish|ingəlishə|Medial and final schwas (after ग and after श) are deleted|-
|विमला (Vimla, a proper name)
|vimlā|viməlā|Medial schwa is deleted 
|-
|सुलोचना (Sulochna, a proper name)
|sulochnā|sulochənā|Medial schwa is deleted 
|}

Vowel nasalisation
With some words that contain /n/ or /m/ consonants separated from succeeding consonants by schwas, the schwa deletion process has the effect of nasalising any preceding vowels. Here are some examples in Hindustani:
 sən.kī (whimsical) in which a deleted schwa that is pronounced in the root word sənək (whimsy) converts the first medial schwa into a nasalised vowel.
 chəm.kīlā (shiny) in which a deleted schwa that is pronounced in the root word chəmək (shine'') converts the first medial schwa into a nasalised vowel.

See also
 Schwa
 Hindustani language
 Indo-Aryan languages
 Devanagari

References

Hindustani language
Urdu
Hindi
Indo-Aryan languages
Indo-Aryan phonologies